The 1910–11 season was the 37th season of competitive football played by Rangers.

Overview
Rangers played a total of 43 competitive matches during the 1910–11 season.

Results
All results are written with Rangers' score first.

Scottish League Division One

Scottish Cup

Appearances

See also
 1910–11 in Scottish football

References

Rangers F.C. seasons
Scottish football championship-winning seasons
Rangers